The 2013–14 Villanova Wildcats men's basketball team represented Villanova University in the 2013–14 NCAA Division I men's basketball season. Led by the school's 13th head coach Jay Wright, the Wildcats participated in the newly organized Big East Conference and played their home games at The Pavilion, with some select home games at the Wells Fargo Center. They finished the season 29–5, 16–2 in Big East play to win the regular season Big East championship. They were upset in the quarterfinals of the Big East tournament by Seton Hall. They received an at-large bid to the NCAA tournament where they defeated Milwaukee in the second round before losing in the third round to eventual National Champions UConn.

Roster

Schedule and results

|-
!colspan=9 style="background:#00337F; color:#FFFFFF;"| Exhibition

|-
!colspan=9 style="background:#00337F; color:#FFFFFF;"| Regular season

|-
!colspan=9 style="background:#00337F; color:#FFFFFF;"| Big East tournament

|-
!colspan=9 style="background:#00337F; color:#FFFFFF;"| NCAA tournament

Rankings

References

Villanova Wildcats
Villanova Wildcats men's basketball seasons
Villanova
Villanova Wildcats men's b
Villanova Wildcats men's b